"Across the Universe" is a song by the English rock band the Beatles. It was written by John Lennon and credited to Lennon–McCartney. The song first appeared on the 1969 various artists' charity compilation album No One's Gonna Change Our World and later, in a different form, on their 1970 album Let It Be, the group's final released album. The original version featured on two different albums both titled Rarities: a 1978 British release and a 1980 US release. It was also included on their 1988 album Past Masters, Volume Two.
The song has been covered by many artists, including David Bowie on his 1975 album Young Americans, which featured contributions from Lennon.

Composition
One night in 1967, the phrase "words are flowing out like endless rain into a paper cup" came to Lennon after listening to the voice of his then-wife Cynthia.

The flavour of the song was heavily influenced by Lennon's and the Beatles' interest in Transcendental Meditation in late 1967 – early 1968, when the song was composed. Based on this, he added the mantra "Jai guru deva om" to the piece, which became the link to the chorus. The Sanskrit phrase is a sentence fragment whose words could have many meanings. Literally it approximates as "Victory to God divine", "Hail to the divine guru", or the phrase commonly invoked by the late Maharishi Mahesh Yogi in referring to his spiritual teacher, "All glory to Guru Dev".

The song's lyrical structure is straightforward: three repetitions of a unit consisting of a verse, the line "Jai guru deva om" and the line "Nothing's gonna change my world" sung four times. The lyrics are highly image-based, with abstract concepts reified with phrases like thoughts "meandering", words "slithering", and undying love "shining". The title phrase "across the universe" appears at intervals to finish lines, although it never cadences, always appearing as a rising figure, melodically unresolved. It finishes on the leading note; to the Western musical ear, the next musical note would be the tonic and would therefore sound complete.

In his 1970 interview with Rolling Stone, Lennon referred to the song as perhaps the best, most poetic lyric he ever wrote: "It's one of the best lyrics I've written. In fact, it could be the best. It's good poetry, or whatever you call it, without chewin' it. See, the ones I like are the ones that stand as words, without melody. They don't have to have any melody, like a poem, you can read them."

Musical structure
On a standard-tuned guitar (EADGBE) the song is played in the key of D; however, the recording was slowed electronically, resulting in a lower C# tuning to the ear. The verse beginning "Words are flowing out" (I (D) chord) is notable for a prolonged vi (Bm)–iii (F#m) to ii7 (Em7) minor drop to the dominant chord V7 (A7) on "across the universe" in the 4th bar. On the repeat of this chord sequence a turn following the ii7 (Em7) through a iv minor (Gm) brings the verse to a close before moving on directly to the tonic on the "Jai Guru Deva Om" refrain. The vi–ii minor drop leading to V was also used in "I Will" (on "how long I've loved you") and George Harrison had utilised a shorter vi–iii minor alternation to delay getting back to the dominant (V) in "I Need You". The verse beginning "Words are flowing out like endless rain..." is also notable for the suitably breathless phrasing and almost constant 8th-note rhythm (initially four D melody notes, then C#, B, A, B).

Recording and version history

February 1968 recordings
In February 1968, the Beatles convened at the EMI Abbey Road studios to record a single for release during their absence on their forthcoming trip to India. Paul McCartney had written "Lady Madonna", and Lennon had "Across the Universe". Both tracks were recorded along with Lennon's "Hey Bulldog" and the vocal track for Harrison's "The Inner Light" between 3 and 11 February.

The basic track was taped on 4 February. Along with acoustic guitar, percussion and tambura, it featured an overdubbed sitar introduction by Harrison. Deciding the song needed a high-pitched voice to sing the refrain "Nothing's gonna change my world", McCartney approached fans waiting outside the studio and asked if anyone could hold a high note. Lizzie Bravo and Gayleen Pease answered yes. Shortly after, the band's road manager, Mal Evans, came out and ushered the two girls into the recording studio to record the backing vocals. Although the girls' voices are not heard on the version of "Across the Universe" on the album Let It Be, their background vocals are heard on the albums No One's Gonna Change Our World, Rarities and Past Masters.

Lennon was still not satisfied with the feel of the track, and several sound effects were taped, including 15 seconds of humming and a guitar and a harp-like sound, both to be played backwards; however, none of these were used on the released version. The track was mixed to mono and put aside as the group had decided to release "Lady Madonna" and "The Inner Light" as the single. On their return from India, the group set about recording the many songs they had written there, and "Across the Universe" remained on the shelf. In the autumn of 1968, the Beatles seriously considered releasing an EP including most of the songs for the Yellow Submarine album and "Across the Universe", and went as far as having the EP mastered.

World Wildlife Fund version
During the February 1968 recording sessions, Spike Milligan dropped into the studio and, on hearing the song, suggested the track would be ideal for release on a charity album he was organising for the World Wildlife Fund. At some point in 1968, the Beatles agreed to this proposal. In January 1969, the best mono mix was remixed for the charity album. In keeping with the "wildlife" theme of the album, sound effects of birds were added to the beginning and end. The original (mono) mix from February 1968 is 3:37 in length. After the effects were added, the track was sped up so that even with 20 seconds of effects, it is only 3:49. Speeding up the recording also raised the key to E-flat. By October 1969, it was decided that the song needed to be remixed into stereo. This was done by Geoff Emerick immediately prior to the banding of the album. "Across the Universe" was first released in this version on the Regal Starline SRS 5013 album No One's Gonna Change Our World in December 1969.

This version was issued, in its stereo form, on four Beatles compilation albums: the British version of Rarities, the different American version of Rarities, The Beatles Ballads, and the second disc of the two-CD Past Masters album, released in 1988.  The January 1969 mono mix, which had been considered for an aborted Yellow Submarine EP, was finally released on Mono Masters, part of The Beatles in Mono box set, in 2009.

Let It Be version

The Beatles took the song up again during the Get Back/Let It Be rehearsal sessions of January 1969; footage of Lennon playing the song appeared in the Let It Be movie. Bootleg recordings from the sessions include numerous full group performances of the song, usually with Lennon–McCartney harmonies on the chorus. To ensure the album tied in with the film, it was decided that the song must be included on what by January 1970 had become the Let It Be album.

Although the song was extensively rehearsed on the Twickenham Studios soundstage, the only recordings were mono transcriptions for use in the film soundtrack. No multitrack recordings were made after the group's move to Apple Studios. Thus in early January 1970 Glyn Johns remixed the February 1968 recording. The new mix omitted the teenage girls' vocals and the bird sound effects of the World Wildlife Fund version. As neither of the Glyn Johns Get Back albums were officially released until 2021, the most well-known version of the song came from Phil Spector, who in late March and early April 1970 remixed the February 1968 recording yet again and added orchestral and choral overdubs. Spector also slowed the track to 3:47, close to its original duration. According to Lennon, "Spector took the tape and did a damn good job with it".

Other versions
A previously unreleased February 1968 alternative take of the song (recorded before the master), without heavy production, appeared on Anthology 2 in 1996. This is often referred to as the "psychedelic" recording because of the strong Indian sitar and tambura sound, and illustrates the band's original uncertainty over the best treatment for the song.

The February 1968 master was remixed again for inclusion on Let It Be... Naked in 2003, at the correct speed but stripped of most of the instrumentation and digitally processed to correct tuning issues.

In 2018, take 6 of the song was released on the 50th anniversary edition of The Beatles (also known as the "White Album"). This version is a bit more sparse than the Let It Be... Naked version and lasts 15 seconds longer.

Later reflections
Lennon was unhappy with the song as it was recorded. In his 1980 Playboy interview, Lennon says that the Beatles "didn't make a good record of it" and says of the Let It Be version that "the guitars are out of tune and I'm singing out of tune... and nobody's supporting me or helping me with it and the song was never done properly". He further accused McCartney of ruining the song:

Personnel

No One's Gonna Change Our World (1969)

According to Ian MacDonald:

The Beatles
 John Lennonlead and backing vocals, lead and acoustic rhythm guitar
 Paul McCartneybacking vocal, piano
 George Harrisonbacking vocal, sitar, tambura
 Ringo Starrmaracas, tom tom

Additional musicians and production
 George MartinHammond organ; producer
 Lizzie Bravobacking vocal
 Gayleen Peasebacking vocal

Let It Be (1970)

According to John C. Winn:

The Beatles
 John Lennonlead vocal, acoustic and electric guitar
 Paul McCartneypiano
 George Harrisontambura
 Ringo Starrdrums, maracas

Additional musicians and production
 Phil Spectorproducer
 uncredited session musicianschoir, cellos, violas, harp, violins, trumpets, trombones

Critical reception and legacy
Music critic Richie Unterberger of AllMusic said the song was "one of the group's most delicate and cosmic ballads" and "one of the highlights of the Let It Be album". 

Music critic Ian MacDonald was critical of the song, calling it a "plaintively babyish incantation" and saying "its vague pretensions and listless melody are rather too obviously the products of acid grandiosity rendered gentle by sheer exhaustion".

NASA transmission
On 4 February 2008, at 00:00 UTC, NASA transmitted the Interstellar Message "Across the Universe" in the direction of the star Polaris, 431 light years from Earth. The transmission was made using a 70-metre antenna in the Deep Space Network's Madrid Deep Space Communication Complex, located outside of Madrid, Spain. It was done with an "X band" transmitter, radiating into the antenna at 18 kW. This was done to celebrate the 40th anniversary of the song's recording, the 45th anniversary of the Deep Space Network (DSN), and the 50th anniversary of NASA. The idea was hatched by Beatles historian Mark Lewisohn, who encouraged all Beatles fans to play the track as it was beamed to the distant star. The event marked the first time a song had ever been intentionally transmitted into deep space, and was approved by McCartney, Yoko Ono, and Apple Corps.

Cover versions

David Bowie version

"Across the Universe" was covered by English singer-songwriter David Bowie in 1975 on his ninth studio album Young Americans. He recorded his cover at Electric Lady Studios in New York City in January 1975, on the same day as "Fame". A blue-eyed soul reworking, his cover is notable for featuring Lennon on guitar and backing vocals. The cover also features Carlos Alomar and Earl Slick on guitar and backing vocals, Emir Ksasan on bass guitar, and Dennis Davis on drums.

Reflecting on his contribution, Lennon later said: "I thought, great, because I'd never done a good version of that song myself. It's one of my favourite songs, but I didn't like my version of it." Bowie concurred, calling the Beatles' original version "very watery" and wanting to "hammer the hell out of it."

Bowie's cover of "Across the Universe" has received predominantly negative reviews from music critics and biographers. Douglas Wolk of Pitchfork calls it "the album's one genuine embarrassment, Vegas-y and bathetic." Biographer Chris O'Leary agrees, calling it "one of his most utterly tasteless recordings." Author Peter Doggett similarly describes it as "bombastic", "mannered", and a "bizarre way of impressing Lennon." Despite being generally regarded as one of Bowie's low points in his "golden years", biographer Nicholas Pegg gave the recording a positive review, calling it "exquisitely beautiful".

Personnel
According to Chris O'Leary:
 David Bowie – lead and backing vocals
 John Lennon – acoustic guitar
 Carlos Alomar – rhythm guitar
 Earl Slick – lead guitar
 Emir Ksasan – bass
 Dennis Davis – drums

Technical
 David Bowie – producer
 Harry Maslin – producer
 Eddie Kramer – engineer

Other versions 
Roger Waters and Andy Fairweather Low performed "Across the Universe" for a BBC TV special "A Journey in the Life of John Lennon" in 1985.

Laibach recorded a cover of "Across the Universe" as part of their covering of the Let It Be album in 1988. 

10cc released a version of the song on the 1993 Alive live album.

In 1998, Fiona Apple recorded and released the song as part of the Pleasantville motion picture soundtrack. Pitchfork named it Apple's best cover, highlighting how it suits the film.

In 2002, Rufus Wainwright recorded a cover version for the film I Am Sam.  

In 2005, Velvet Revolver featuring Stevie Wonder performed it during the 47th Grammy Awards. The musicians included Billie Joe Armstrong, Bono, Norah Jones, Alicia Keys, Alison Krauss on fiddle, Tim McGraw, Slash playing 12-string guitar, Steven Tyler, Brian Wilson, and Stevie Wonder on lead vocals and harmonica.  The performance was recorded as a tribute to the 2004 tsunami victims. It was released on 13 February 2005 and debuted at number 22 on the Billboard Hot 100 chart as a digital download.

In 2011, Beady Eye released a cover of "Across the Universe" as a charity single available to download through their website from 4 April 2011 until 17 April 2011. All proceeds from the sale of the track went directly toward the British Red Cross Japan Tsunami Appeal. The single charted at #88 in the UK.

Scorpions released a version of the song on the 2011 Comeblack compilation album.

On Christmas Day of 2019, New West Records released a cover version of "Across the Universe" performed by Lily & Madeleine with the Accidentals.

Rock band Evanescence released a cover as part of the deluxe version of their fourth studio album, The Bitter Truth, in 2021. 

Classical pianist Aki Takahashi worked with the composer Akemi Naito to produce a radically deconstructed version for her 'Hyper-Beatles' project.

Notes

References

Further reading

External links

  

1969 songs
The Beatles songs
Songs written by Lennon–McCartney
Song recordings produced by George Martin
Song recordings produced by Phil Spector
Songs published by Northern Songs
The Beatles and India
Cilla Black songs
David Bowie songs
Music videos directed by Paul Thomas Anderson
1960s ballads
Folk ballads
Psychedelic folk songs